Tutankhamun and the Daughter of Ra is a novel written by Moyra Caldecott in 1989. It was first published in 1990 as Daughter of Ra in paperback by Arrow Books Limited.

Plot introduction
Based on the lives of Tutankhamun and Ankhesenamun.

Tutankhamun and the Daughter of Ra is part of Moyra Caldecott’s Egyptian sequence, which also includes Hatshepsut: Daughter of Amun and Akhenaten: Son of the Sun. Chronologically, Tutankhamun and the Daughter of Ra takes place after the other two books.

Plot summary

Ankhesenamun has never been safe in all her short life – not even with her beloved husband and half brother Tutankhamun.

Daughter of Pharaoh Akhenaten and the fabled Nefertiti, and married at one time to her father, she is forced to marry Tutankhamun by the powerful General Horemheb at a time of bitter political and religious division. Ankhesenamun is the delicate link between scheming factions.

Left vulnerable by the failure of her plans for the sacred egg of Ra and the death of her young husband, Ankhesenamun is forced into making one last extraordinary and desperate bid for life and happiness...

Characters in "Tutankhamun and the Daughter of Ra"
Tutankhamun – the main protagonist
Ankhesenamun – half sister and wife to Tutankhamun 
Horemheb – General in Pharaoh's army

Release details
1990, UK, Arrow Books Limited , Pub date ? ? 1990, paperback
2000, UK, Mushroom Publishing , Pub date ? ? 2000, ebook
and subsequently in other eBook formats over the next three years. 
2004, UK, Bladud Books , Pub date 21 April 2004, paperback (a print on demand paperback)

1990 novels
Novels set in the 14th century BC
Novels set in ancient Egypt
Cultural depictions of Tutankhamun
Arrow Books books